Reisen may refer to:

Rydzyna, Poland
A6M Reisen, the Japanese fighter aircraft extensively used in World War II
Helmut Reisen (1950- ), German economist
Zalman Reisen (1887-1940), Russian lexicographer of Yiddish
Reisen Udongein Inaba, a fictional character of the Touhou Project scrolling shooters